Chris Penny is an English retired footballer who played professionally in the USL A-League and National Professional Soccer League.

Penny had a brief career in England before moving to the United States. Highlights of his English career involve a monumental centre back partnership at Cramlington Blue Star where his star shone brightly (polished by his enigmatic partner Andy Webb) Chris broke up this partnership early, wary of the risks of ‘one more season’ and took the unenviable journey south to the capital of East Yorkshire, Grimsby where playing in the sacred Black and Whites, he embarked on a YTS, sports car on order. In 1991, he moved from Brigg Town F.C. to Doncaster Rovers F.C.  In February 1992, he played one game for Doncaster Rovers F.C. In April 1992, Penny played four games with Grantham Town F.C. In the fall of 1992, Penny came to the United States on a scholarship to Lock Haven University of Pennsylvania where he was a 1994 and 1995 First Team Division II All American. The expansion Philadelphia KiXX selected Penny in the Territorial Round of the NPSL Amateur Draft as the first player they signed. In the spring of 1997, Penny moved to the Hershey Wildcats of the USISL A-League. While playing, he also pursued a graduate degree in education at Pennsylvania State University. Since his retirement from playing, Penny is a full professor and teaches at West Chester University College of Education.

Penny is married and they have three boys together and is punching well above his fighting weight.

References

External links
 Honors for a teacher who uses technology to best advantage

Living people
1973 births
Brigg Town F.C. players
Doncaster Rovers F.C. players
English footballers
English expatriate footballers
Grantham Town F.C. players
Grimsby Town F.C. players
Hershey Wildcats players
National Professional Soccer League (1984–2001) players
Philadelphia KiXX players
A-League (1995–2004) players
West Chester University faculty
Association football defenders
English expatriate sportspeople in the United States
Expatriate soccer players in the United States